Anthony Manuel is an American former basketball player. He grew up in Chicago, Illinois and played basketball at Crane High School. He then played for Bradley University from 1985 to 1989 and holds school records for most assists in a season (373 in 1987–88) and in a career (855). He was the Missouri Valley Conference Men's Basketball Player of the Year in 1989.

See also
List of NCAA Division I men's basketball players with 20 or more assists in a game

References

Year of birth missing (living people)
1960s births
Living people
American men's basketball players
Basketball players from Chicago
Bradley Braves men's basketball players
Place of birth missing (living people)
Point guards